Wendy Larry (born March 25, 1955) was the head coach of the Old Dominion Lady Monarchs basketball team. She coached the team in the 1997 NCAA National Championship game against the Lady Vols of the University of Tennessee in Cincinnati, Ohio. Her Lady Monarchs teams have reached a total of 20 NCAA Tournaments, set an NCAA record with 17 Colonial Athletic Association (CAA) titles, and Larry coached in 608 career victories.

Born in Bloomingdale, New Jersey, Larry graduated from Butler High School and was recognized as the commencement speaker at the school's 100th graduation ceremonies in 2006.

Larry was awarded the US Basketball Writers Association (USBWA) Coach of the Year award in 1997.

In May 2011, Larry announced her retirement from Old Dominion, after her team did not reach the NCAA tournament in two successive seasons.  The university did not offer to extend her contract, which had one year remaining.

In June 2012, Larry accepted a position as an associate commissioner of the Atlantic 10 Conference, focusing her work on women's basketball.

See also
 List of college women's basketball coaches with 600 wins

References

1955 births
Living people
American women's basketball coaches
Arizona Wildcats women's basketball coaches
Basketball coaches from New Jersey
Old Dominion Monarchs women's basketball coaches
People from Bloomingdale, New Jersey
Sportspeople from Passaic County, New Jersey
21st-century American women